James Martin Barnes (April 8, 1886 – May 24, 1966) was an English golfer and a leading figure in the early years of professional golf in the United States. He is one of three native Britons (with Tommy Armour and Rory McIlroy) to win three different modern major professional championships.

Early life
Barnes was born on April 8, 1886 in Lelant, Cornwall. Barnes was like many golfers of his era, and worked as a caddie and a club-maker's apprentice while growing up. He moved to the United States and turned professional in 1906, but never became an American citizen. He arrived in San Francisco, and later worked in Vancouver, British Columbia, Spokane, Washington, and Tacoma, Washington, and then at The Broadmoor in Colorado Springs.

Golf career
From 1923 to 1926, he was resident professional at the Temple Terrace Golf and Country Club in Temple Terrace, Florida, which hosted the 1925 Florida Open (dubbed "The Greatest Field of Golfers Ever to Play in Florida"), as well as the 1926 Florida Open with over one hundred contestants and a $5,000 cash prize. In 1925–26 his good friend and fellow golfer Fred McLeod wintered with him, and they worked with James Kelly Thomson from North Berwick.

He later moved west to the Oakland, California, area where he resided for many years. Barnes authored several books on golf technique. He died at age 80 in East Orange, New Jersey, and is buried in Orange's Rosedale Cemetery.

He won nine majors, with four of them the modern professional majors. Many golfers and media covering the sport at the time, according to golf journalist Dan Jenkins, the Western Open and North and South Open titles he won at the time were declared majors.

PGA Championship: 1916, 1919
U.S. Open: 1921
The Open Championship: 1925
Western Open: 1914, 1917, 1919
North and South Open: 1916, 1919

Barnes' two PGA titles were the first in the event; there was no tournament in 1917 or 1918 because of World War I. His winning margin in the 1921 U.S. Open was nine strokes, a record which was not broken until Tiger Woods won by 15 strokes in 2000.

Barnes was one of the most prolific tournament winners of the first few seasons of the PGA Tour, which was also founded in 1916. He won 22 times on the tour in total. He led the tournament winners list in four seasons: 1916 with three, 1917 with two (shared with Mike Brady), 1919 with five and 1921 with four. His win in the 1937 Long Island Open marked the first PGA Tour win by a player past his 50th birthday. In 1940, Barnes was honored as one of the 12 golfers to be inducted in the PGA's inaugural Hall of Fame. Later he was inducted into the World Golf Hall of Fame in 1989.

Professional wins (29)

PGA Tour wins (22)
1914 (1) Western Open 
1916 (3) North and South Open, Connecticut Open, PGA Championship
1917 (2) Western Open, Philadelphia Open Championship
1919 (5) North and South Open, Shawnee Open, Western Open, PGA Championship, Southern Open
1920 (1) Shawnee Open
1921 (4) Deland Open, Florida Open, U.S. Open, Main Line Open
1922 (1) California Open Championship
1923 (1) Corpus Christi Open
1925 (1) The Open Championship
1926 (1) Mid-Winter Tournament
1930 (1) Cape Cod Open
1937 (1) Long Island Open

Modern major championships are shown in bold.

Other wins
Note: This list may be incomplete
1909 Northwest Open
1911 Northwest Open
1912 Northwest Open
1913 Northwest Open
1915 Connecticut Open
1921 California State Open
1939 New Jersey State Open

Major championships

Wins (4)

Note: The PGA Championship was match play until 1958

Results timeline

Note: Barnes never played in the Masters Tournament.

NYF = Tournament not yet founded
NT = No tournament
CUT = missed the half-way cut
DNQ = Did not qualify for match play portion 
R32, R16, QF, SF = Round in which player lost in PGA Championship match play 
"T" indicates a tie for a place

Summary

Most consecutive cuts made – 27 (1912 U.S. Open – 1926 Open)
Longest streak of top-10s – 8 (1919 PGA – 1922 Open)

See also

List of golfers with most PGA Tour wins
List of men's major championships winning golfers

References

External links

PGA Museum of Golf: Hall of Fame – member profiles
Temple Terrace Golf and Country Club

English male golfers
American male golfers
PGA Tour golfers
Winners of men's major golf championships
World Golf Hall of Fame inductees
Golf writers and broadcasters
Golfers from New Jersey
People from Lelant
Sportspeople from Cornwall
American people of Cornish descent
British emigrants to the United States
1886 births
1966 deaths